Invincible Armor is a 1977 Hong Kong-Taiwanese kung fu film starring Hwang Jang-lee, John Liu, and Tino Wong.

Plot
On patrol through town, Ming General Chow (Liu) observes a fighter, Hu Lung, fending off a group of bandits. Impressed by the fighter's skills, General Chow arranges for Hu Lung to meet the Minister of Royal Security as a potential candidate for joining the Ming forces. While sparring in the courtyard to test his skills, Hu Lung produces a knife and assassinates the Minister before leaping over the courtyard wall and escaping. As General Chow rushes to the Minister's aid, the guards arrive and immediately arrest Chow for the murder. En route to the court, a group of soldiers arrives with orders to kill Chow, who defeats the group and escapes.

Ming Minister of State Cheng (Lee), an authoritarian ruler and master of the Eagle Claw and Iron Armor techniques, summons his most skilled enforcer, Shen Yu (Wong), to hunt down Chow and arrest him. Chow hunts for Hu Lung, but must avoid the authorities along the way who are attempting to kill him. He eventually finds Hu Lung, but is thwarted by Shen Yu as Hu runs away. Chow informs Shen Yu that he has been wrongly accused and that Hu Lung is the actual murderer, but Shen is not convinced and he fights with Chow. The fight is interrupted by an old man claiming to also be after General Chow, and fights with Shen over who will get to bring him in. Chow uses this opportunity to escape and continues his pursuit of Hu Lung.

The old man is later revealed to be Hu Lung's old teacher, who previously expelled Hu from their clan. Hu confesses to his old teacher that he was paid by Minister Cheng, a former classmate of the old man, to carry out the assassination. The old man confronts the Minister over his actions and sets a trap to kill him, but is killed by Cheng in their ensuing fight.

Meanwhile, Chow learns the Iron Finger technique  from the old man's grandson and granddaughter to defeat Cheng's Iron Armor, but his training is cut short when Shen Yu and a 2nd enforcer sent by the Minister arrive to arrest him again. After the 2nd enforcer attempts to kill Chow over Shen's objections but fails, Shen begins to doubt Chow's guilt and gives him three days to locate Hu Lung and clear his name. Before he can catch up with Hu Lung, Hu is killed by Cheng, however Shen discovers evidence on Hu's body that the Minister was involved.

Minister Cheng's plot is exposed and he is confronted by Chow, Shen Yu, and the old man's two grandchildren. During the fight, Chow discovers that Cheng's weak spot is his testicles and that Cheng is able to retract them into his body for protection. Through the group's combined efforts, Chow is able to use his Iron Finger technique to cause Cheng to drop his testicles so Chow and crush them, killing Cheng.

Cast
Hwang Jang-lee – Minister Cheng
John Liu – Chow Lung Fu
Lee Hoi-sang – Hu Lung
Tino Wong – Shen Yu
Phillip Ko – Hu's teacher

Reception
Review aggregator site Rotten Tomatoes gives the film a score of 82% based on 321 user reviews.

Notes
The main theme for Tonino Valerii's Spaghetti Western film Day of Anger, scored by Riz Ortolani is used multiple time throughout the film.

External links

Kung fu films
1977 films
1977 martial arts films
Hong Kong martial arts films
Taiwanese martial arts films
1970s Mandarin-language films
1970s Hong Kong films